The M. F. Sumtsov Kharkiv Historical Museum (Ukrainian: Харківський історичний музей імені М. Ф. Сумцова, Kharkivskyi Istorychnyi Muzei Imeni M. F. Sumtsova) is a history museum located in Kharkiv, Ukraine. Its dedicated to history and culture of Ukraine and ethnicities living here.

History 
The museum was established in 1920 by Mykola Sumtsov as the Museum of the Sloboda Ukraine (Музей Слобідської України). It got the best collections from Kharkiv University Museum and the city Art and Industry Museum.

The collection of Kharkiv University Museum started to accumulate in 1804. Its objects were used for students teaching. This collection was one of the first museum collections in Ukraine.
The city Art and Industry Museum was founded in 1886. Its ethnographic collection was one of the largest and best among all city museums in Russian Empire.
In 1902 the nationwide Archaeological Congress was held in Kharkiv. A huge previous search work was conducted. There were collected a large number of valuable objects of history, ethnography, art that revealed history and culture of  inhabitants of the region. For participants of the Congress the exhibitions were created to demonstrate these objects. Later most of the objects became a part of the collection of M.F. Sumtsov Kharkiv Historical Museum.
The World War II was a heavy blow to the museum's collections. At this time a significant part of the collection has been lost. 

On June 18, 2015, the museum was named after its founder and first director — Mykola Sumtsov.
Today the M. F. Sumtsov Kharkiv Historical Museum retains the significance of the research, scientific-methodical and cultural-educational center of the Kharkiv region.

Exhibitions  
 Archeology of the Kharkiv region
 Kharkiv region during middle ages and cossack era
 Ethnic traditions of the Kharkiv region
 Cossack era in ukrainian history
 Kharkiv during 19th century
 Kharkivites on the fronts of World War I (1914-1918)
 Kharkiv region in the Revolution of 1917 and interwar period (1917–1940)
 World War ІІ
 Kharkiv in Soviet time 1943–1991
 Antiterrorist operation and Kharkiv region

See also 
 Mykola Sumtsov

References

External links 

 Official site of the M.F.Sumtsov Kharkiv Historical Museum
 

Museums established in 1920

Museums in Kharkiv
History museums in Ukraine
Culture in Kharkiv